Santi Chaiyaphurk (Thai สันติ ไชยเผือก) is a Thai retired football player. While at Pattaya United, he was  the captain of the club.

Managerial statistics

Honours

Player
S.League: Champion (2004,2005), with Tampines Rovers FC
Singapore Cup: Champion (2004,2006), with Tampines Rovers FC
ASEAN Club Championship: Champion (2005), with Tampines Rovers FC

References 

1978 births
Living people
Santi Chaiyaphuak
Santi Chaiyaphuak
Santi Chaiyaphuak
Expatriate footballers in Singapore
Tampines Rovers FC players
Singapore Premier League players
Association football midfielders
Association football fullbacks
Santi Chaiyaphuak